After the Ball is a lost 1914 silent film drama directed by Pierce Kingsley and starring stage couple Herbert Kelcey and Effie Shannon.

Cast
Herbert Kelcey - John Dale
Effie Shannon - Louise Tate
Robert Vaughn - Gerald Tate
William Clark - Mr. Tate, the Father
Winona Bridges - Mrs. Tate, the Mother                                                       
Robert Lawrence - Mr. Seward
Jean Barry - Mrs. Seward
Joyce Fair - Nina Seward
Nicholas Burnham - The Doctor
G. H. Adams - Briggs, John's Valet
William Frederic - The Detective (as William Fredericks)
Edythe Berwyn - The Nurse
Barney McPhee - McPhee
James A. Fitzgerald - Cody (*as J.A. Fitzgerald)
J. S. Murray - Slim

References

External links
 After the Ball at IMDb.com

1914 films
American silent feature films
Lost American films
American black-and-white films
Silent American drama films
1914 drama films
1914 lost films
Lost drama films
Films directed by Pierce Kingsley
1910s American films